Tamerlan Tausovich Bashaev (born 22 April 1996) is a Russian judoka. In 2021, he won one of the bronze medals in the men's +100 kg event at the 2020 Summer Olympics held in Tokyo, Japan.

In 2020, he won the gold medal in the men's +100 kg event at the European Judo Championships held in Prague, Czech Republic. He also won the silver medal in his event at the 2021 World Judo Championships held in Budapest, Hungary.

He won the gold medal in the men's +100 kg event at the 2017 European U23 Judo Championships held in Podgorica, Montenegro. In 2018, he won the silver medal in the men's +100 kg event at the 2018 European Judo Championships held in Tel Aviv, Israel.

In 2021, he lost his bronze medal match against Henk Grol of the Netherlands, in the men's +100 kg event at the Judo World Masters held in Doha, Qatar.

References

External links
 
 

Living people
1996 births
Place of birth missing (living people)
Russian male judoka
Judoka at the 2020 Summer Olympics
Medalists at the 2020 Summer Olympics
Olympic medalists in judo
Olympic bronze medalists for the Russian Olympic Committee athletes
Olympic judoka of Russia
21st-century Russian people